GALEX Arecibo SDSS Survey (GASS) is a large targeted survey at Arecibo Observatory that has been underway since 2008 to measure the neutral hydrogen content of a representative sample of approximately 1000 massive galaxies selected using the Sloan Digital Sky Survey and GALEX imaging surveys. The telescope being used is the world's largest single-dish radio telescope and can receive signals from distant objects.

See also
GALEX
Sloan Digital Sky Survey
Radio astronomy

References
 

Astronomical imaging
Astronomical surveys